New Berlin is a city located in eastern Waukesha County in the U.S. state of Wisconsin. The population was 40,451 at the 2020 census, making it the third-largest community in Waukesha County after the cities of Waukesha and Brookfield.

Pronunciation

Area residents put the accent on the first syllable of Berlin, rather than the second.

History

The first settlers, Sidney Evans and P.G. Harrington, arrived in the northeastern part of what is now New Berlin in 1836. The area first came under local government in 1838 as part of the Town of Muskego, which at the time was composed of New Berlin and Muskego. The area that is now New Berlin was separated from Muskego in 1839 and named the Town of Mentor.

On January 13, 1840, Mentor became New Berlin. It was named by Evans after his hometown, New Berlin, New York. The town remained a rural and agricultural area until the 1940s, when the westward migration to the suburbs from Milwaukee began. Between 1850 and 1950, New Berlin's population went from 1,293 to 5,334. Ten years later, in 1960, the population had nearly tripled to 15,788. The Town of New Berlin became the City of New Berlin with its incorporation in 1959.

Large-scale growth occurred in the 1960s and 1970s, mainly as a result of the construction of the New Berlin Industrial Park, which began in 1964. The park comprises three separate business parks encompassing , including Moorland Road Industrial Park, New Berlin Industrial Park and MSI/Lincoln Avenue Industrial Park.

Interstate 43 was expanded at the Moorland Road exit to accommodate a growing number of commuters. The new interchange has a two-lane roundabout that has been the center of a great deal of controversy because of the high number of accidents and traffic backups on 43.

Geography

New Berlin is located at  (42.979063, −88.109188). It straddles the Sub-Continental Divide, which runs north–south through the eastern part of the city.  Nearly  in the western part of the city, or about 73% of the city's total land area, is west of the Sub-Continental Divide in the Fox River watershed, which is part of the Mississippi River watershed. The remaining area is within the Great Lakes/St. Lawrence River drainage basin.

Michael Joseph Gross of GQ said that "On the map, New Berlin forms a neat six-by-six-mile square in the southeast corner of Waukesha County".

Calhoun and Prospect are populated places within the city of New Berlin.

Climate

Demographics

The median income for a household in the city was $73,688, and the median income for a family was $90,659. Males had a median income of $42,008 versus $33,329 for females. The per capita income for the city was $36,609. About 2.1% of families and 3.0% of the population were below the poverty line, including 2.9% of those under age 18 and 4.6% of those age 65 or over.

As of 2009 most New Berlin residents were middle class professionals. Some of them are descendants of area farming families. Others originated from white flight from Milwaukee in the 1960s and 1970s.

2010 census

As of the census of 2010, there were 39,584 people, 16,292 households, and 11,327 families residing in the city. The population density was 1,086.2 people per square mile (400.6/km2). There were 14,921 housing units at an average density of 405.0 per square mile (156.4/km2). The racial makeup of the city was 93.4% White, 0.7% African American, 0.3% Native American, 3.8% Asian, 0.6% from other races, and 1.1% from two or more races. Hispanic or Latino of any race were 2.6% of the population.

There were 16,292 households, of which 26.7% had children under the age of 18 living with them, 60.7% were married couples living together, 5.8% had a female householder with no husband present, and 30.5% were non-families. 25.2% of all households were made up of individuals, and 11.2% had someone living alone who was 65 years of age or older. The average household size was 2.42 and the average family size was 2.92.

In the city, the population was spread out, with 21.3% under the age of 18, 6.2% from 18 to 24, 22.5% from 25 to 44, 33% from 45 to 64, and 16.9% who were 65 years of age or older. The median age was 44.9 years. For every 100 females, there were 94.6 males. For every 100 females age 18 and over, there were 92.3 males.

Infrastructure 

The Utility Service Area is supplied with water from Lake Michigan, which is purchased from the Milwaukee Water Works. In the eastern portion of the city, wastewater is returned to Lake Michigan via the Milwaukee Metropolitan Sewerage District sewer system. The western portions of the city, outside of the Utility Service Area, use groundwater/private wells as their water supply source. Four municipal wells act in a reserve capacity. The groundwater acquired from these wells is found in two distinct shallow water bearing geologic formations, or aquifers. The water from these aquifers is radium compliant.

New Berlin is located mainly north of Interstate 43 on the latter's course from Beloit to Milwaukee and Green Bay, and south of Interstate 94 between Waukesha and Milwaukee. WIS 59 runs through the northern border of the city as Greenfield Road. Other major roads include Moorland Road, and National Avenue (old WIS 15).

Government

The eight-member Common Council consists of seven aldermen, representing each of the city's seven aldermanic districts, and the mayor. The mayor is elected to serve a term of four years; aldermen are elected to serve a term of three years. The mayor of New Berlin is David Ament. The Common Council adopts the city budget and passes laws, policies and regulations that govern the city.

Economy

Largest employers

According to the city's 2017 Comprehensive Annual Financial Report, the largest employers in the city are:

Education

Schools in the School District of New Berlin are:
 New Berlin Eisenhower Middle/High School
 New Berlin West Middle/High School
 Elmwood Elementary
 Orchard Lane Elementary
 Poplar Creek Elementary
 Ronald Reagan Elementary

There are three private elementary (K4–8) schools in New Berlin:
 Heritage Christian Schools
 Star of Bethlehem Lutheran School
 Holy Apostles Elementary School

Recreation

Facilities include playing fields at Malone Park, near New Berlin's City Hall, and a disc golf course at Valley View Park, in the southeastern part of the city.

Recognition 

 Money magazine ranked New Berlin #11 in its 2017 Top 100 Best Places to Live in America.

Notable people

 Meghan Coffey, Miss Wisconsin 2006
 Glenn Robert Davis, the only US Congressman native to Waukesha County
 Marc C. Duff, Wisconsin State Representative
 Alvarus E. Gilbert, Wisconsin State Representative and farmer
 George M. Humphrey, Wisconsin State Representative
 Benjamin Hunkins, pioneer and Wisconsin territorial and state legislator
 Robert Hastings Hunkins, pioneer and Vermont state legislator
 Julie Goskowicz Koons, speed skater
 C. E. McIntosh, Wisconsin State Representative and lawyer
 Terry Ratzmann, mass murderer
 John C. Schober, Wisconsin State Representative and lawyer

References

External links

 City of New Berlin

Cities in Wisconsin
Cities in Waukesha County, Wisconsin
Populated places established in 1836
1836 establishments in Wisconsin Territory